Janež Kršinar (born 7 April 1962) is a Slovenian cross-country skier. He competed at the 1984 Winter Olympics and the 1988 Winter Olympics.

References

1962 births
Living people
Slovenian male cross-country skiers
Olympic cross-country skiers of Yugoslavia
Cross-country skiers at the 1984 Winter Olympics
Cross-country skiers at the 1988 Winter Olympics
Skiers from Ljubljana